The elegant margareta rat (Margaretamys elegans) is a species of rodent in the family Muridae. It is endemic to the island of Sulawesi in Indonesia.

References

Margaretamys
Rodents of Sulawesi
Mammals described in 1981
Taxonomy articles created by Polbot